Guang Qi (pinyin) or  Kuang Chi (Wade–Giles) may refer to:

光啓 / 光啟 / 光启 
Guāng Qǐ (pinyin) or  Kuang Ch'i (Wade–Giles) is a Chinese given name, may refer to:

 Xu Guangqi, Chinese scholar-bureaucrat, Catholic convert, agricultural scientist, astronomer, and mathematician of the Ming Dynasty
 Xu Guangqi Memorial Hall (徐光启纪念馆)
 Kuang-Chi a Chinese technology company named after Xu Guangqi 
 Xavier School, also known as Kuang Chi School (Hokkien: Kông Khē Hák Hàu; meaning: Guāngqǐ School), a Chinese-language Filipino school named after Xu Guangqi
 Lu Guangqi, an official of the Chinese dynasty Tang Dynasty

广汽 / 廣汽 
Guǎngqì (pinyin) or Kuang-Ch'i (Wade–Giles) may refer to:

 Guangqi Honda, a Sino-Japanese joint venture
 GAC Group,, parent company of Guangqi Honda

See also

 Guang (disambiguation)
 Kuang (disambiguation)
 Qi (disambiguation)
 Chi (disambiguation)